Etruscan cities were a group of ancient settlements that shared a common Etruscan language and culture, even though they were independent city-states. They flourished over a large part of the northern half of Italy starting from the Iron Age, and in some cases reached a substantial level of wealth and power. They were eventually assimilated first by Italics in the south, then by Celts in the north and finally in Etruria itself by the growing Roman Republic.

The Etruscan names of the major cities whose names were later Romanised survived in inscriptions and are listed below. Some cities were founded by Etruscans in prehistoric times and bore entirely Etruscan names. Others, usually Italic in origin, were colonised by the Etruscans, who in turn Etruscanised their name.

The estimates for the populations of the largest cities (Veii, Volsinii, Caere, Vulci, Tarquinia, Populonia) range between 25,000 and 40,000 each in the 6th century BC.

Twelve cities or nations
Of several Etruscan leagues, the Dodecapolis (or "twelve cities") of the Etruscan civilization is legendary amongst Roman authors, particularly Livy. However the dodecapolis had no fixed roster and if a city was removed it was immediately replaced by another.
By the time the dodecapolis had sprung into the light of history, the Etruscan cities to the north had been assimilated by invasions of the Celts, and those of the south by infiltration of the Italics.

Etruscan cities were autonomous states, but they were linked in the dodecapolis and had a federal sanctuary at the Fanum Voltumnae near Volsinii.

Table of cities in Etruscan, Latin and Italian
The table below lists Etruscan cities most often included in the Dodecapolis as well as other cities for which there is any substantial evidence that they were once inhabited by Etruscans in any capacity. Roman and Italian names are given, but they are not necessarily etymologically related. For sources and etymologies (if any) refer to the linked articles.

References

Sources

 Available in the Gazetteer of Bill Thayer's Website at

Further reading
Dennis, George. 1883. The cities and cemeteries of Etruria. 2nd ed. London: John Murray.
De Puma, Richard D., and J. Penny Small, eds. 1994. Murlo and the Etruscans: Art and society in ancient Etruria. Madison: University of Wisconsin Press.
Drago Troccoli, Luciana. 2006. Cerveteri. Rome: Libreria dello Stato.
Hall, John F., ed. 1996. Etruscan Italy: Etruscan influences on the civilizations of Italy from antiquity to the modern era. Provo, UT: Museum of Art, Brigham Young University.
Haynes, Sybille. 2000. Etruscan civilization: A cultural history. Los Angeles: J. Paul Getty Museum.
Leighton, Robert. 2004. Tarquinia: An Etruscan city. London: Duckworth.
Phillips, Kyle M., Jr. 1993. In the hills of Tuscany: Recent excavations at the Etruscan site of Poggio Civitate (Murlo, Siena). Philadelphia: University Museum, University of Pennsylvania.
Riccioni, Giuliana. 1979. "Vulci: A topographical and cultural survey." In Italy before the Romans: The Iron Age, Orientalizing, and Etruscan periods. Edited by David Ridgway and Francesca R. Ridgway, 241–76. London and New York: Academic Press.
Turfa, Jean MacIntosh, ed. 2013. The Etruscan World. Milton Park, Abingdon, Oxon: Routledge.

External links

 Names of the member-cities of the Etruscan Leagues (c. 750–270 BC) in Etruscan and Italian